The Muslim Banjaraor Turka Lambadi are a Muslim community found in the states of Gujarat, Madhya Pradesh and Uttar Pradesh in India. Many members of this community migrated to Pakistan in 1947, and have settled in Karachi and Sindh. They are also known as the Makrani, especially in Uttar Pradesh, and they use Mikrani as their surname. The Muslim Banjara speak Banjari, also called Lambadi.

Present circumstances
The Turka Banjara have a caste council (biradari panchayat), which settles criminal offences like adultery and rape. The caste council is headed by a naik, and consists of fifteen members. They also have set up the All India Banjara Muslim Federation, which is an India-wide caste association. The community has been campaigning to obtain scheduled tribe status, a privilege already granted to the Hindu Banjara.

References

Social groups of Pakistan
Social groups of Uttar Pradesh
Muslim communities of Uttar Pradesh
Social groups of Uttarakhand
Social groups of Madhya Pradesh
Muslim communities of Gujarat
Social groups of Gujarat
Muhajir communities
Banjara people